The Bilo Mountains are a ridge or small range in the Balkan Mountains of western Bulgaria, in Sofia Province. Bilo (Било) in Bulgarian means ridge.

Notes

Mountain ranges of Bulgaria
Balkan mountains
Landforms of Sofia Province